Tommy Leigh (born 13 April 2000) is an English professional footballer who plays as a midfielder for  Accrington Stanley.

Career
Tommy Leigh came through the youth ranks at Portsmouth before being released at the age of 16.

Following his release from Portsmouth, Leigh went on to play semi-professionally for Baffins Milton Rovers, where his father, Steve Leigh, was manager and his brother, Ashton Leigh, also played. In his first season with the side, Leigh made 14 appearances, scoring on one occasion. The following season, Leigh made 43 appearances and found the back of the net on 10 occasions. 

In 2019, Leigh joined Bognor Regis Town, where his brother Ashton had moved to the previous year. In his first season with Town, Leigh made 36 appearances and scored 9 goals, going on to score 2 goals in 18 appearances the following season.

In July 2021, Leigh joined League One side Accrington Stanley for an undisclosed fee. Leigh made his Football League debut on 14 August 2021, coming off the bench against Cambridge United.

References

External links
 
 Accrington Stanley Profile

2000 births
Living people
English footballers
Association football midfielders
Portsmouth F.C. players
Baffins Milton Rovers F.C. players
Bognor Regis Town F.C. players
Accrington Stanley F.C. players
English Football League players